Imago is the second full-length album by Russian power metal band Catharsis. It was released in 2002 by Irond. In 2003, a Russian language twin album Имаго (Imago) was released.

Track listing
 1'33'' Until...  – 1:36
 Imago  – 3:51
 Heart of the World  – 4:13
 Shatter My Dreams  – 3:59
 Silence Flows...  – 4:49
 Chosen by Heaven  – 4:29
 Sunrise Beast  – 4:57
 Tarantul (Instrumental)  – 3:51
 Dancing in the Fire  – 4:08
 Star Waterfall  – 4:12
 Crusader  – 4:53
 Follow The Sun (Bonus Track)  – 4:02

Members
Oleg Zhilyakov – lead and backing vocals
Igor Polyakov – rhythm and acoustic guitars
Julia Red – keyboards
Oleg Mission – lead and acoustic guitars, flute
Andrey Ischenko – drums, percussion
Alexander Timonin – bass

2002 albums
Catharsis (Russian band) albums